Uhm Hyun-kyung (born November 4, 1986) is a South Korean actress. She first appeared in  Rainbow Romance in 2005. In her recent years, Hyun-kyung became notable for playing the evil and two-faced villain Min Soo-a in Hide and Seek. Recently, she starred as the female lead in the daily melodrama Man in a Veil.

Filmography

Television series

Film

Variety show

Music video

Awards and nominations

References

External links
 Uhm Hyun-kyung at High Entertainment
 
 
 
 

1986 births
Living people
People from Nonsan
South Korean television actresses
South Korean film actresses
Konkuk University alumni
L&Holdings artists
Yeongwol Eom clan